SS Columbia was a  Ocean liner, built for the Anchor Line as a passenger and cargo liner that was launched on 22 February 1902 and went on her first voyage on 17 May 1902 in the North Atlantic Ocean. During World War I on 20 November 1914, she was taken over and was rebuilt into an armed merchant cruiser named Columbella. As Columbella, she had eight 4.7 inch guns. In 1917, eight 6 inch guns were added and she was returned to her original owners in June 1919 and renamed to Moreas. She was sold to Greece in 1928 and was later scrapped in Italy in 1929.

References

External links
 

1902 ships
Ocean liners of the United Kingdom
World War I Auxiliary cruisers of the Royal Navy